George Edward White (14 January 1905 – 5 May 1986), Australian politician, was a Member of the Victorian Legislative Assembly for the Electoral district of Mentone representing the Labor Party from 1945 to 1947 and from 1950 to 1955 and the Australian Labor Party (Anti-Communist) (Democratic Labor Party) from March–April 1955.

References

1905 births
1986 deaths
Australian Labor Party members of the Parliament of Victoria
Democratic Labor Party (historical) members of the Parliament of Victoria
Members of the Victorian Legislative Assembly
20th-century Australian politicians